Titta Jokinen (born 23 February 1951 in Kalanti, Finland) is a Finnish actress.

Career 
Jokinen has appeared in both Finnish film and television since 1973. She appeared in the 1983 James Bond spoof Agent 000 and the Deadly Curves opposite actors Ilmari Saarelainen and Tenho Sauren but since the 1980s has mainly appeared on TV.

Personal life 
Jokinen's daughter Kiti Kokkonen is an actress and writer.

References

External links

1951 births
Living people
People from Uusikaupunki
Finnish film actresses
Finnish television actresses